The 2015-16 Oman First Division League (known as the Omantel First Division League for sponsorship reasons) is the 40th edition of the second-highest division overall football league in Oman. The season began on 1 October 2015 and concluded on 22 April 2016. Muscat Club are the defending champions, having won their first title in the previous 2014–15 season. At the end of the 9th round in the play-offs, on Friday, 15 April 2016, Al-Rustaq SC were crowned the champions of the 2015–16 Oman First Division League with one game to spare after a 1-0 win over Bowsher Club winning their first ever domestic title and hence earning promotion to the top flight for the first time in the club's history.. Al-Rustaq SC along with Oman Club and Ja'lan SC earned promotion to 2016–17 Oman Professional League.

Group A

Results

Clubs season-progress

Group B

Results

Clubs season-progress

Play-offs

Format
3 top teams each from Group A and Group B advanced to the play-offs stage. Each team in the play-offs stage plays a home and an away tie against the remaining 5 teams. The winners and the runners-up earn promotion to 2016-17 Oman Professional League and the second runners-up plays a promotion play-off against the 12th positioned team of the 2015–16 Oman Professional League.

Table

Results

On 20 February 2016, due to pitch invasion, the match between Al-Seeb Club and Bowsher Club was abandoned after second half with Bowsher leading 2-0; Oman Football Association on 25 February confirmed the result as 3-0 for Bowsher and also announced a 500 Omani rials fine on Al-Seeb.

Clubs play-offs-progress

Promotion/relegation play-off

1st Leg

2nd Leg

Ja'lan earned promotion to 2016–17 Oman Professional League after winning 3-2 on aggregate.

OFA Awards
Oman Football Association awarded the following awards for the 2015–16 Oman First Division League season.
Top Scorer: Shawqi Al-Ruqadi (Bowsher)
Best Player: Essam Al-Barahi (Al-Rustaq)
Best Goalkeeper: Mohammed Al-Busaidi (Oman)
Best Coach: Mustafa Suwaib (Al-Rustaq)
Best Team Manager: Jasim Al-Hasani (Ja'lan)
Fair Play Award: Al-Seeb Club

See also
2015–16 Oman Professional League
2015–16 Oman Second Division League
2015–16 Sultan Qaboos Cup

References

Oman First Division League seasons
Oman
2015–16 in Omani football